The list of ship launches in 1967 includes a chronological list of all ships launched in 1967.


References

Sources
 

1967
Ship launches